Nikola Ćirić and Goran Tošić were the defending champions but Ćirić decided not to participate.
Tošić played alongside Boris Pašanski.
Nikola Mektić and Antonio Veić defeated Blaž Kavčič and Franco Škugor 6–3, 5–7, [10–7] in the final to win the title.

Seeds

Draw

Draw

References
 Main Draw

Uruguay Open - Doubles
2012 Doubles
2012 in Uruguayan tennis